The Skalatones were a Swedish ska band, formed in 1995 in Landskrona. They have been compared to The Specials, The Selecter and Madness.

History

The group's first album, which came out in 1997, was By Public Demand. In 1998 they released the EP Mr Probation Officer followed by another EP, Ruder Than Roots and then the compilation The Best Tracks So Far on the label Pork Pie.

Their second album emerged in 1999: Tune In.... This led to the single Anniversary Single 2YK in 2000. The band broke up in 2001.

In 2007, members of The Skalatones formed a new ska band, Mobster.

Discography

Album 
 1997: By Public Demand
 1999: Tune In...

Compilations 
 1998: The Best Tracks So Far

EPs 
 1998: Mr Probation Officer
 1998: Ruder Than Roots

Singles 
 2000: Anniversary Single 2YK

References 

Swedish pop music groups
English-language singers from Sweden
Musical groups established in 1995